Aleksandr Ernepesov (born 27 February 1995) is a Turkmen tennis player.

Ernepesov hasn't a career high ATP singles ranking yet.
 
Ernepesov has represented Turkmenistan at Davis Cup, where he has a win–loss record of 21–18.

He played at the 2014 Asian Games on singles he lost in the 2nd round against the late winner Yoshihito Nishioka, in doubles with Georgiý Poçaý lost in the 2nd round against Gong Maoxin-Li Zhe Chinese duo.

References

External links 
 
 
 

1995 births
Living people
Turkmenistan male tennis players
Tennis players at the 2014 Asian Games
Asian Games competitors for Turkmenistan